USS Western Chief (ID-3161) was a cargo ship of the United States Navy that served during World War I and its immediate aftermath. As SS Western Chief, she was sunk during World War II after being sold to the United Kingdom for use as a merchant ship.

Construction and acquisition

Western Chief was laid down as the steel-hulled, single-screw commercial cargo ship SS Western Chief by the Northwest Steel Company in Portland, Oregon, for the Compagnie Générale of France  under a United States Shipping Board contract. She was launched on 20 April 1918. The Shipping Board transferred her to the U.S. Navy at Portland on 3 July 1918 for use during World War I. Assigning her the naval registry identification number 3161, the Navy commissioned her at Portland on 3 July 1918 as USS Western Chief (ID-3161).

Navy career
Assigned to the Naval Overseas Transportation Service, Western Chief departed Portland on 12 July 1918 carrying 7,170 tons of flour and proceeded via the Panama Canal to New York City, making port there on 15 August 1918. After unloading her flour, she loaded 20 trucks and moved to Norfolk, Virginia, from which she got underway on 22 August 1918 as part of a convoy bound for France. She arrived at Brest, France, on 22 September 1918.

Western Chief departed Brest on 8 October 1918 for the return voyage to the United States. She reached New York on 24 October 1918, then got underway again the same day and steamed to Newport News, Virginia.

Western Chief made three more round-trip cargo runs to Europe. She was at sea on the first of these voyages bound for La Pallice, France, when the armistice with Germany ended World War I.

On 16 April 1919, Western Chief got underway for Europe with a full cargo of flour, beginning her final U.S. Navy voyage. She called at the Hook of Holland; Dartmouth, England; Danzig, Germany; and Copenhagen, Denmark, before she returned to the United States, making port at Baltimore, Maryland, on 25 June 1919.

Decommissioning and disposal

Western Chief  was decommissioned, struck from the Navy list, and transferred back to the U.S. Shipping Board on 28 June 1919.

Later career
Once again SS Western Chief, the ship was in mercantile service from 1919.

Early in World War II, the British government purchased Western Chief to help to alleviate the shipping shortage the United Kingdom faced due to losses to Axis submarines.

Notes

References
 
 NavSource Online: Section Patrol Craft Photo Archive Western Chief (ID 3161)

Cargo ships of the United States Navy
World War I cargo ships of the United States
Ships built in Portland, Oregon
1918 ships
World War II merchant ships of the United Kingdom
Ships sunk by Italian submarines
World War II shipwrecks in the Atlantic Ocean
Maritime incidents in March 1941